Catocala grisatra (grisatra underwing) is a moth of the family Erebidae. It is found from the coastal plain in Bladen County, North Carolina, south through Georgia  to Florida.

The wingspan is 48–55 mm. Adults are on wing from May to June. There is one generation per year.

The larvae feed on Crataegus.

References

External links
Species info

Moths described in 1936
grisatra
Moths of North America